"I Miss You" is a hit single recorded by American R&B and pop band Klymaxx for their fourth album, Meeting in the Ladies Room (1984). Written and co-produced by Klymaxx keyboardist Lynn Malsby, the song was released as the album's third single. "I Miss You" eventually reached number 5 on the US Billboard Hot 100 chart, number 2 on the New Zealand Singles Chart, and number 1 on the Canadian RPM Top Singles chart. Despite peaking at number 5 in the US, it was ranked at number 3 on the year-end Billboard chart for 1986, mainly because of its run on the pop chart lasting for 29 weeks.

Credits
Joyce "Fenderella" Irby: Lead vocals, bass guitar
Lorena Porter Shelby: Additional vocals
Lynn Malsby: Keyboards
Robin Grider: Keyboards
Cheryl Cooley: Guitar
Bernadette Cooper: Drums, percussion
Background vocals by Julia Tillman Waters, Maxine Willard Waters, and Oren Waters

Charts

Weekly charts

Year-end charts

Certifications

Cover versions
 In 1985, Dionne Warwick performed the song live on Solid Gold.
 In 1990, Seiko Matsuda performed the song live on Music Fair.
 In 2004, Boyz II Men covered the song on their Throwback, Vol. 1 album.
 In 2007, Freya Lim covered the song on her Freya's Love Songs album.
 In 2008, Filipino R&B singer Kyla covered the song on her album Heart 2 Heart.
 In 2021, Brenda K. Starr released a cover of a song as a single.

References

1984 songs
1985 singles
Contemporary R&B ballads
Klymaxx songs
Brenda K. Starr songs
MCA Records singles
Pop ballads
RCA Victor singles
RPM Top Singles number-one singles